Juan Manuel Díaz Martínez (born 28 October 1987) is a former Uruguayan footballer.

Career
Díaz was signed by Estudiantes de La Plata in January 2008. He made his debut 2–1 win over against Banfield on February 8, 2008. He scored his first Estudiantes goal against Rosario Central on April 25, 2008. He was sent off against LDU Quito on April 29, 2008.

During the 2008–09 season, Díaz was part of the Estudiantes squad that experienced finishing as runners up in Copa Sudamericana 2008 and then went on to win Copa Libertadores 2009. In January 2010, Club Atlético River Plate signed the Uruguayan wingback from Estudiantes.

In July 2010, Nacional made public his interest on the left wingback.

On 8 July 2016, Diaz signed a two-year contract with Superleague club AEK Athens for an undisclosed fee. He was released by mutual consent in March 2017.

International career
Díaz also capped for Uruguay U-20 at 2007 South American Youth Championship and 2007 FIFA U-20 World Cup.

On July 27, 2010 he was reserved to play a friendly match with Uruguay first team against  Angola in Lisboa .

Honours
Estudiantes de La Plata
Copa Libertadores: 2009

References

External links

 Argentine Primera statistics
Juan Manuel Díaz profile and statistics at soccernet

1987 births
Living people
Uruguayan footballers
Uruguay under-20 international footballers
Uruguayan expatriate footballers
Liverpool F.C. (Montevideo) players
Estudiantes de La Plata footballers
Club Atlético River Plate footballers
AEK Athens F.C. players
Super League Greece players
Expatriate footballers in Greece
Expatriate footballers in Argentina
Association football forwards
Uruguayan Primera División players
Argentine Primera División players